West Yangon District is a district of the Yangon Region in Myanmar.

Townships
 Ahlon
 Bahan
 Dagon
 Hlaing
 Kamayut
 Kyauktada
 Kyimyindaing
 Lanmadaw
 Latha
 Mayangon
 Pabedan
 Sanchaung

Seikkan Township was split and merged into Botataung Township and Lanmadaw Township in February 2020.

References 

Districts of Myanmar